Ganga Ki Kasam is a 1999 Indian Hindi-language action film directed by T L V Prasad, produced by Sunil Bohra starring Mithun Chakraborty, Jackie Shroff, Dipti Bhatnagar, Mink Singh, Johnny Lever, Shakti Kapoor, Dalip Tahil, Mukesh Rishi and Raza Murad.

Plot
An authoritative robber in the criminal world, Shankar, comes to a village where bandits led by Jay Singh are creating a real mess. Without hesitation, Shankar enters the fight on the side of the villagers and swears by the waters of the sacred river that lawlessness will no longer happen.

Cast
Mithun Chakraborty as Shankar
Jackie Shroff as Jay Singh
Dipti Bhatnagar as Geeta
Mink Singh as Rani
Dalip Tahil as Sahadev Sharma
Johnny Lever as Qawali Singer
Mukesh Rishi as Joga
Raza Murad as Police commissioner
Shakti Kapoor as Mastan baba
Rami Reddy as Police inspector
Jack Gaud as Bhim singh
Shahbaz Khan as gang
Kasam Ali as gang
Shiva as Champa
Ali Khan
Kasim Khan
Anjana Mumtaz as Lakshmi
Razzak Khan as Niamanzur
Anirudh Tiwari

Soundtrack
"Bawala Mai Hua Bawla" - Jaspinder Narula, Sukhwinder Singh, Ram Shankar
"Banna Re Bagho Me Jhula Ghalo" - Sukhwinder Singh, Jaspinder Narula
"Jab Moore Saiya" - Poornima
"Hame Pata Hai (Qawwali)" - Altaf Raja, Sadhana Sargam
"Hai Rabba Hai Rabba" - Sadhana Sargam
"More Kurta Me Khatmal" - Poornima, Amit Kumar

References

External links
 

1999 films
1990s Hindi-language films
Mithun's Dream Factory films
Films shot in Ooty
Films scored by Bappi Lahiri
Indian action films
1999 action films
Hindi-language action films